These quarterbacks have started at least one game for the New Orleans Saints of the National Football League. They are listed in order of the date of each player's first start at quarterback for the Saints.

The number of games they started during the season is listed to the right:

Regular season

Postseason

Most games as starting quarterback
These quarterbacks have the most starts for the Saints in regular season games (through the 2020 NFL season).

Team career passing records

(Through the 2020 NFL season)

References

New Orleans

quarterbacks